"You're the One" is a song written and recorded by American country music artist Dwight Yoakam.  It was released in February 1991 as the second single from his album If There Was a Way.  It peaked at #5 in the United States, and #4 in Canada.

Content
The song's narrator describes about how his former lover treated him, and now she's been treated the same way that she treated him.

Music video
The music video was directed by Jim Gable.

Demo version
Yoakam initially recorded a demo of the song in 1981, 9 years before its inclusion on If There Was a Way. It is included on both the 2002 boxed set Reprise Please, Baby, and the 2006 reissue of his debut album, Guitars, Cadillacs, Etc., Etc.

Chart performance

Year-end charts

References

Dwight Yoakam songs
1991 singles
Songs written by Dwight Yoakam
Reprise Records singles
1990 songs
Song recordings produced by Pete Anderson